Esteban Valenzuela Van Treek (born 12 March 1964) is a Chilean journalist, politician and writer, born in Rancagua. Since 11 March 2022, he has served as Chile's Minister of Agriculture. Mayor of Rancagua from 1992 to 1996, and Deputy from 2002 to 2010.

His brother Darío also was mayor of Rancagua.

Since January 2021, he is vice-president of the Social Green Regionalist Federation.

Works 
 Fragmentos de una generación (1987)
 Cómo ganarle a la rabia (1988)
 Matilde espera carta de Alemania (1994)
 Pichilemu Blues (1996)
 La fecundidad de un gobierno local (1997)
 Alegato histórico regionalista (1999)
 El fantasma federal en Chile: la potencia de la reforma regional (2003)
 Soborno sour (2005)
 La voz terrible: Infante y el valdiviano federal (2008)
 Nahual Maya: los días con sentido (2012)
 Dios, Marx... y el MAPU (2014)

References

External links 
 Website of Esteban Valenzuela

1964 births
Living people
People from Rancagua
Chilean male writers
Chilean journalists
Male journalists
Pontifical Catholic University of Chile alumni
University of Wisconsin–Madison alumni
University of Valencia alumni
Instituto O'Higgins de Rancagua alumni
Mayors of places in Chile
Members of the Chamber of Deputies of Chile
Party for Democracy (Chile) politicians
Social Green Regionalist Federation politicians
Ministers of Agriculture of Chile